Dinon or Deinon (Greek  or ) of Colophon (c. 360–340 BC) was a Greek historian and chronicler, the author of a history of Persia, many fragments of which survive. The Suda mistakenly attributes this work to Dio Cassius. He is the father of Cleitarchus.

He takes the history of the near East from where Ctesias leaves off, and, while indulging in the taste for the low, was held in considerably more regard than that author's Persica.

External links
Article at the Enciclopedia Iranica

Editions
 Lenfant, Dominique (ed., trans. comm.), Les histoires perses de Dinon et d'Héraclide (Paris: De Boccard, 2009) (Persika, 13).

Ancient Colophonians
Classical-era Greek historians
Historians from ancient Anatolia
Achaemenid Empire